Marko Bošnjak (born 11 January 2004) is a Bosnian-Croatian pop singer. He rose to fame as the winner of the second season of the Serbian talent show Pinkove Zvezdice.

Music career
Starting on 4 September 2015, Bošnjak appeared as a contestant on the second season of the Serbian talent show Pinkove Zvezdice (Pink's Little Stars). On the first show, Bošnjak sang Jennifer Hudson's song "One Night Only". All five judges, Milan Stanković, Jelena Tomašević, Goca Tržan, Hari Varešanović and Leontina Vukomanović, turned their chairs up and voted him directly into the next round. At his second appearance he sang Zdravko Čolić's "Kao moja mati" (Like My Mother) and advanced into the next round. On 6 January 2016, Bošnjak sang a rendition of Jadranka Stojaković's "Što te nema" (Why Are You Not Here). During the next episode, on 8 April 2016, Bošnjak performed Adele's "Don't You Remember". In the final, Bošnjak re-sang "Što te nema" and won the competition.

On 17 December 2021, Bošnjak was announced as one of the fourteen participants in Dora 2022, the national contest for Croatia's Eurovision Song Contest 2022 entry, with the song "Moli za nas" (Pray For Us). At the close of voting, the song had received 179 points, placing second in a field of 14. "Moli za nas" was officially released on 10 February 2022 as Bošnjak's debut single. On 27 April 2022, it was announced that Bošnjak will compete on the 62nd edition of the Split Festival with the song "Pjesma za kraj".

Discography

Singles

Awards and nominations

References

2004 births
Living people
People from Prozor-Rama
Croats of Bosnia and Herzegovina
21st-century Bosnia and Herzegovina male singers